Al G. Manning (June 19, 1927 – April 8, 2006) was an American author, occultist, certified public accountant, and the founder of ESP Lab of Texas (formerly ESP Laboratory in Los Angeles, California). He authored 23 self-help books and 11 correspondence courses, many tapes and videos, with 40 years of monthly ESP LAB newsletters, mostly related to the development and use of psychic powers for personal and planetary benefit with positive spiritual development. These included intuition, clairvoyance, clairaudience, spirit contact, astral projection, and others. His work is carried on by the ESP Lab, now located in Colorado.

Bibliography
 Eye of Newt in My Martini: a Certified Public Accountant Turned Occultist Tells Why and How (1981), Pan Ishtar Unlimited , 
 Faerie Tales Are True - Get Your Share (with Rachel L. Manning) (1986), Pan/Ishtar Unlimited ,  
 Helping Yourself with ESP: Tap the Power of Extra-Sensory Perception and Make It Work for You (1999), Prentice Hall Press , 
 Helping Yourself with Psycho-Cosmic Power (1983), Pan/Ishtar Unlimited , 
 Helping Yourself with the Power of Gnostic Magic (1984), Pan/Ishtar Unlimited , 
 Helping Yourself with Real Spirit Contact (1990), Pan Ishtar Unlimited , 
 Helping Yourself with White Witchcraft (2002), Prentice Hall Press , 
 How to Get the Most Out of Life: a Novel Approach That Works Because It's Fun (1988), Pan Ishtar Unlimited ,  
 Life After Death? Sex? Dinner?: The Lighter Side of the Occult (1983), Pan Ishtar Unlimited ,  
 The Magic of New Ishtar Power (1978), Prentice Hall , 
 Mighty Maverick Magick (The Essence of Victorious Living) (1983), Pan Ishtar Unlimited
 Miracle of Universal Psychic Power: How to Pyramid Your Way to Prosperity (1974) Prentice Hall Trade , 
 Miracle Spiritology (1975), Pan/Ishtar Unlimited , 
 The Miraculous Laws of Universal Dynamics (1964), Pan Ishtar Unlimited ,  (reprinted by Prentice Hall 1965)
 Moon Lore and Moon Magic (1980), Pan Ishtar Unlimited ,  
 Rainbows Falling on My Head: The Magic of the Great God Pan (1982), Pan/Ishtar Unlimited , 
 Real Ritual Magick (For People Ready to Enjoy Life, NOW) (1987), Pan Ishtar Unlimited , 
 Your Golden Key to Success (1982), Pan Ishtar Unlimited , 
 You're Beautiful: Quick Reference Self Help Program for All Situations (1987), Pan Ishtar Unlimited ,

References

External links
 ESP Lab.

American occult writers
Astral projection
People from Texas
1927 births
2006 deaths